Mascot Hotel is a heritage business hotel owned by KTDC with five star status in Thiruvananthapuram, Kerala. The hotel offers large rooms with high ceilings due to its British era architectural design.

History
The area where the Mascot Hotel is currently situated used to be the camp of the Travancore Army. The hotel was thereafter built in the area to accommodate  officers of the British Army during  World War I. Post war, the Travancore royal family starting using the hotel to welcome their guests. Later on KTDC took over the hotel, and till now, the hotel stands as a heritage location for tourists. It is the oldest star hotel of KTDC and is also considered the only heritage business hotel in Trivandrum.

Takeaway
In 2015, a takeaway section was opened in the Hotel.

Centenary Celebrations
In 2019, the Hotel celebrated its centenary as five star status. A comprehensive project for the restoration of the heritage hotel was undertaken as part of the celebrations. The heritage block building, rooms, passages were strengthened along with the beautification of the premises, and improvement of various amenities. During the ICC Cricket World Cup 2019, Mascot Hotel had conducted a special screening of the matches for the guests at a special fare.

References

Hotels in Thiruvananthapuram
Heritage hotels in India
Buildings and structures in Thiruvananthapuram